Richmond Harding (28 September 1923 – 21 October 2010) was an English television director, producer, second unit director, and assistant director. He was the son of a chartered surveyor. Harding fought in Burma during the war with the Indian Mountain Artillery. He directed seven episodes of the British television series The Avengers in 1962 and 1963, and was credited with the idea of clothing Honor Blackman in black leather as Catherine Gale in the series. Later in the 1960s, he directed several episodes of the TV series Z-Cars, Coronation Street, Emergency – Ward 10 and others.

He also contributed to films Scott of the Antarctic, Passport to Pimlico, Whisky Galore!, The Great Game and Appointment in London.

Credits

References

External links

 Harding interviewed by Rodney Giesler, 2001 – British Entertainment History Project

1923 births
2010 deaths
English television directors
English television producers